Sikkil is an Indian unisex given name that may refer to
Sikkil Sisters – Kunjumani & Neela, Indian flute players
Sikkil Gurucharan (born 1982), Indian Carnatic musician, grandson of Kunjumani & Neela
Sikkil Mala Chandrasekar (born 1963), Indian flute player, daughter of Neela
Sikkil R. Bhaskaran (born 1936), Indian violinist

Indian given names